The Lars and Agnes Jensen House at 87 North 800 West in Orem, Utah was built in 1885 from hewn logs.  It is probably the only remaining log house in Orem.

It was listed on the National Register of Historic Places in 1999.

References

Houses on the National Register of Historic Places in Utah
Neoclassical architecture in Utah
Houses completed in 1885
Houses in Orem, Utah
National Register of Historic Places in Orem, Utah